Exposé: America's Investigative Reports was a half-hour PBS documentary series that detailed some of the most revealing investigative journalism in America. Thirteen/WNET and the Center for Investigative Reporting launched the series as AIR: America's Investigative Reports on September 1, 2006. When the second season premiered on June 22, 2007, the series was retitled Exposé: America's Investigative Reports. Also in 2007, the series won the News & Documentary Emmy Award for Outstanding Story In A News Magazine for the episode "Blame Somebody Else."  Exposé's third and final season began on February 22, 2008, and aired as part of the hour-long series Bill Moyers Journal.

Episodes

Season 1

Season 2

Season 3

References

External links
 
 

2000s American television news shows
PBS original programming
Television series by WNET
2006 American television series debuts